Emperador may refer to:

the Spanish equivalent of the title "emperor";
in particular Holy Roman Emperor Charles V, who was also King of Spain
Emperador, Valencia, a municipality in eastern Spain.
Red Emperador, another name for the Australian wine grape Emperor
A brand of cookies made by the Mexican company Gamesa
Emperador Distillers Inc., a subsidiary of Alliance Global Group Inc. of the Philippines, best known for its Emperador (brandy)
Emperador (brandy), the world's top-selling brand of brandy by volume
 A fish, such as a member of the Lethrinidae family or the emperor angelfish

See also
 Imperator totius Hispaniae